The third Gotabaya Rajapaksa cabinet was the central government of Sri Lanka led by President Gotabaya Rajapaksa. It was formed in April 2022 after the mass resignation of the previous cabinet and ended in May 2022, following the resignation of Prime Minister Mahinda Rajapaksa.

As of 21 April 2022, the cabinet had 19 members – the president, prime minister and 17 ministers. There were also 27 state ministers who were not members of the cabinet. One cabinet minister was also a state minister.

Cabinet members
Ministers appointed under article 43(1) of the constitution. The 19 member cabinet is as follows:

State ministers
Ministers appointed under article 44(1) of the constitution.

Notes

References

2022 establishments in Sri Lanka
Cabinets established in 2022
Cabinet of Sri Lanka
2022 disestablishments in Sri Lanka
Cabinets disestablished in 2022
Gotabaya Rajapaksa